Susan Goatman (born 5 February 1945) is an English former cricketer who played as a right-handed batter. She appeared in 3 Test matches and 15 One Day Internationals for England between 1979 and 1982. She was captain of England for their 1979 series against West Indies and for the 1982 World Cup. Her final WODI appearance was in the final of the 1982 Women's Cricket World Cup.

She also captained Young England at the 1973 World Cup, playing all of their 6 matches in the tournament. She played domestic cricket for Kent.

References

External links
 
 

1945 births
Living people
Sportspeople from Kent
England women Test cricketers
England women One Day International cricketers
Kent women cricketers
Young England women cricketers